Galindez can refer to:
 Galíndez, novel by Manuel Vázquez Montalbán
 Galindez Island, in the Argentine Islands off Antarctica

Names
 García Galíndez (d. 833), Count of Aragon
 Aznar Galíndez I (d. 839), Count of Aragon
 Aznar Galíndez II (d. 893), Count of Aragon
 Andregoto Galíndez (fl 930s), Queen Consort of Pamplona
 Jesús Galíndez, (1915-1956), writer and lecturer on international law
 Víctor Galíndez (1948-1980), Argentine boxer